Kylie Ann Minogue  (born 28 May 1968) is an Australian singer, songwriter and actress. She is the highest-selling female Australian artist of all time, having sold over 80 million records worldwide. She has been recognised for reinventing herself in music and fashion, for which she is referred to by the European press as the "Princess of Pop" and a style icon. Her accolades include a Grammy Award, three Brit Awards and 17 ARIA Music Awards.

Born and raised in Melbourne, Minogue first achieved recognition starring in the Australian soap opera Neighbours, playing tomboy mechanic Charlene Robinson. She gained prominence as a recording artist in the late 1980s and released four bubblegum and dance-pop-influenced studio albums produced by Stock Aitken Waterman. By the early 1990s, she had amassed several top ten singles in the UK and Australia, including "I Should Be So Lucky", "The Loco-Motion", "Hand on Your Heart", and "Better the Devil You Know". Taking more creative control over her music, Minogue signed with Deconstruction Records in 1993 and released Kylie Minogue (1994) and Impossible Princess (1997), both of which received positive reviews. She returned to mainstream dance-oriented music with 2000's Light Years, including the number-one hits "Spinning Around" and "On a Night Like This". The follow-up, Fever (2001), was an international breakthrough for Minogue, becoming her best-selling album to date. Two of its singles, "Love at First Sight" and "In Your Eyes", became hits, but its lead single, "Can't Get You Out of My Head" became one of the most successful singles of the 2000s, selling over five million units.

Minogue continued reinventing her image and experimenting with a range of genres on her subsequent albums, which spawned successful singles such as "Slow", "2 Hearts", "All the Lovers", "Santa Baby", "Timebomb" and "Dancing". With her 2020 album Disco, she became the first female artist to have a chart-topping album in the UK for five consecutive decades. Minogue made her film debut in The Delinquents (1989) and portrayed Cammy in Street Fighter (1994). She has also appeared in the films Moulin Rouge! (2001), Jack & Diane, Holy Motors (2012) and San Andreas (2015). In 2014, she appeared as a judge on the third series of The Voice UK and The Voice Australia. Her other ventures include product endorsements, children's books, fashion, and charitable work.

Minogue was appointed an Officer of the Order of the British Empire in the 2008 New Year Honours for services to music. She was appointed by the French government as a Chevalier (knight) of the Ordre des Arts et des Lettres for her contribution to the enrichment of French culture. In 2005, while Minogue was on tour, she was diagnosed with breast cancer. She was awarded an honorary Doctor of Health Science (D.H.Sc.) degree by Anglia Ruskin University in 2011 for her work in raising awareness for breast cancer. At the 2011 ARIA Music Awards, she was inducted by the Australian Recording Industry Association into the ARIA Hall of Fame. She was appointed Officer of the Order of Australia (AO) in the 2019 Australia Day Honours.

Life and career

1968–1986: Early life and career beginnings
Kylie Ann Minogue was born in Melbourne, Australia, on 28 May 1968, the daughter of car company accountant Ronald Charles Minogue and his wife Carol Ann (née Jones), a former ballet dancer. Both parents had moved to Australia in 1958 as part of an assisted migration scheme on the ship Fairsea. Also aboard were the Gibb family of later Bee Gees fame. Minogue is of English and Welsh descent (though her surname is of Irish origin) and was named after the Nyungar word for "boomerang". She is the eldest of three children: her brother, Brendan Minogue, is a news cameraman in Australia, and her sister, Dannii Minogue, followed her steps and is a singer and television host. The family frequently moved around various suburbs in Melbourne to sustain their living expenses, which Minogue found unsettling as a child. She would often stay at home reading, sewing, and learning to play violin and piano. When they moved to Surrey Hills, Victoria, she went on to Camberwell High School. During her schooling years, she found it difficult to make friends. She got her HSC with subjects including Arts and Graphics and English. Minogue described herself as being of "average intelligence" and "quite modest" during her high school years. Growing up, she and her sister Dannii took singing and dancing lessons.

A 10-year-old Minogue accompanied Dannii to a hearing arranged by the sisters' aunt, Suzette, and, while producers found Dannii too young, Alan Hardy gave Minogue a minor role in soap opera The Sullivans (1979). She also appeared in another small role in Skyways (1980). In 1985, she was cast in one of the lead roles in The Henderson Kids. Minogue took time off school to film The Henderson Kids and while Carol was not impressed, Minogue felt that she needed the independence to make it into the entertainment industry. During filming, co-star Nadine Garner labelled Minogue "fragile" after producers yelled at her for forgetting her lines; she would often cry on set. Minogue was dropped from the second season of the show after producer Alan Hardy felt the need for her character to be "written off". In retrospect, Hardy stated that removing her from the showing "turned out to be the best thing for her". Interested in following a career in music, Minogue made a demo tape for the producers of weekly music program Young Talent Time, which featured Dannii as a regular performer. Minogue gave her first television singing performance on the show in 1985 but was not invited to join the cast. Minogue was cast in the soap opera Neighbours in 1986, as Charlene Mitchell, a schoolgirl turned garage mechanic. Neighbours achieved popularity in the UK, and a story arc that created a romance between her character and the character played by Jason Donovan culminated in a wedding episode in 1987 that attracted an audience of 20 million viewers. Minogue became the first person to win four Logie Awards in one year and was the youngest recipient of the "Gold Logie" as the country's "Most Popular Television Performer", with the result determined by public vote. She was in a relationship with Donovan for three years, until 1989.

1987–1989: Kylie and Enjoy Yourself

During a Fitzroy Football Club benefit concert, Minogue performed "I Got You Babe" as a duet with fellow actor John Waters, and "The Loco-Motion" as an encore. Producer Greg Petherick arranged for Minogue to record a demo of the latter song, re-titled as "Locomotion". The demo was sent to the head of Mushroom Records Michael Gudinski, who decided to sign Minogue in early 1987 based on her popularity from Neighbours. The track was first recorded in big band style, but was later given a completely new backing track by producer Mike Duffy, inspired by the hi-NRG sound of UK band Dead or Alive. "Locomotion" was released as her debut single in Australia on 13 July 1987, the week after the Neighbours wedding episode premiered. The  single became the best-selling single of the decade in Australia according to the Kent Music Report. The success of "Locomotion" resulted in Minogue travelling to London to work with record producing trio Stock Aitken Waterman in September 1987. They knew little of Minogue and had forgotten that she was arriving; as a result, they wrote "I Should Be So Lucky" while she waited outside the studio. The track was written and recorded in under 40 minutes. Although Minogue needed to be convinced to work with Stock Aitken Waterman again after feeling she'd been disrespected during her first recording session, more sessions with the producers occurred from February to April 1988 in London and Melbourne, where the singer was filming her last episodes for Neighbours. The trio ended up composing and producing all the tracks on the forthcoming album and produced a new version of "The Loco-Motion". Producer Pete Waterman justified the highly controversial decision to re-record the latter track by claiming Minogue's platinum-selling Australian version was poorly produced, but Mike Duffy instead blamed the decision on Waterman's alleged wish to claim the prestige and royalties from the track's placement of the soundtrack of the 1988 film Arthur 2: On the Rocks.

Minogue's self-titled debut album, Kylie, was released in July 1988. The album is a collection of dance-oriented pop tunes and spent more than a year on the UK Albums Chart, including several weeks at number one, eventually becoming the best-selling album of the 1980s by a female artist. It went gold in the United States, while the single "The Locomotion" reached number three on the U.S. Billboard Hot 100 chart, and number one on the Canadian dance chart. The single "Got to Be Certain" became her third consecutive number one single on the Australian music charts. Later in the year, she left Neighbours to focus on her music career. Minogue also collaborated with Jason Donovan on the song "Especially for You", after intense demand for the duet from the public, media and retailers overcame her initial reservations. The track peaked at number-one in the United Kingdom and, in December 2014, sold its one millionth copy in the UK. Minogue was sometimes referred to as "the Singing Budgie" by her detractors over the coming years. In a review of the album Kylie for AllMusic, Chris True described the tunes as "standard, late-80s ... bubblegum", but added, "her cuteness makes these rather vapid tracks bearable". She received the ARIA Award for the year's highest-selling single. The song reached number one in the United Kingdom, Australia, Germany, Finland, Switzerland, Israel and Hong Kong. Minogue won her second consecutive ARIA Award for the year's highest-selling single, and received a "Special Achievement Award".

Minogue's second album, Enjoy Yourself, was released in October 1989. It was a success in the United Kingdom, Europe, New Zealand, Asia and Australia and spawned the UK number-one singles "Hand on Your Heart" and "Tears on My Pillow". However, it failed to sell well throughout North America, and Minogue was dropped by her American record label Geffen Records. She then embarked on her first concert tour, the Enjoy Yourself Tour, in the United Kingdom, Europe, Asia and Australia in February 1990. She was also one of the featured vocalists on the remake of "Do They Know It's Christmas?". Minogue's debut film, The Delinquents, was released in December 1989. The movie received mixed reviews by critics but proved popular with audiences. In the UK it grossed more than £200,000, and in Australia, it was the fourth-highest-grossing local film of 1989 and the highest-grossing local film of 1990. From 1989 to 1991, Minogue dated INXS frontman Michael Hutchence.

1990–1992: Rhythm of Love, Let's Get to It and Greatest Hits

Minogue's third album, Rhythm of Love, was released in November 1990 and was described as "leaps and bounds more mature" than her previous albums by AllMusic's Chris True. The album did not match the commercial success of its predecessors, but three of its singles – "Better the Devil You Know", "Step Back in Time" and "Shocked – reached the top ten in both the UK and Australia. Entertainment Weeklys Ernest Macias observed that, in Rhythm of Love, Minogue "presented a more mature and sexually-fueled image". Macias also pointed out that the album "showcases the beginning of Minogue's career as a pop icon, propelled by her angelic vocals, sensual music videos, chic fashion, and distinct dance sound."
Her relationship with Michael Hutchence was also seen as part of her departure from her earlier persona. The making of the "Better the Devil You Know" music video was the first time Minogue "felt part of the creative process". She said: "I wasn't in charge but I had a voice. I'd bought some clothes on King's Road for the video. I saw a new way to express my point of view creatively." To promote the album, Minogue embarked on the Rhythm of Love Tour in February 1991.

Minogue's fourth album, Let's Get to It, was released in October 1991 and reached number 15 on the UK Albums Chart. It was her first album to fail to reach the top ten. While the first single from the album, "Word Is Out", became her first single to miss the top ten of the UK Singles Chart, subsequent singles "If You Were with Me Now" and "Give Me Just a Little More Time" both reached the top five. In support of the album, she embarked on the Let's Get to It Tour in October. She later expressed her opinion that she was stifled by Stock, Aitken and Waterman, saying, "I was very much a puppet in the beginning. I was blinkered by my record company. I was unable to look left or right." Her first best-of album, simply titled Greatest Hits, was released in August 1992. It reached number one in the United Kingdom and number three in Australia. The singles from the album, "What Kind of Fool" and her cover version of Kool & the Gang's "Celebration", both reached the top 20 of the UK Singles Chart.

1993–1998: Kylie Minogue and Impossible Princess

Minogue's signing with Deconstruction Records in 1993 marked a new phase in her career. Her fifth album, Kylie Minogue, was released in September 1994 and was a departure from her previous efforts as it "no longer featured the Stock-Aitken-Waterman production gloss", with critics praising Minogue's vocals and the album production. It was produced by dance music producers the Brothers in Rhythm, namely Dave Seaman and Steve Anderson, who had previously produced "Finer Feelings", her last single with PWL. As of 2015, Anderson continued to be Minogue's musical director. The album peaked at number four on the UK Albums Chart and was certified gold in the country. Its lead single, "Confide in Me", spent four weeks at number one on the Australian singles chart. The next two singles from the album, "Put Yourself in My Place" and "Where Is the Feeling?", reached the top 20 on the UK Singles Chart.

During this period, Minogue made a guest appearance as herself in an episode of the comedy The Vicar of Dibley. Director Steven E. de Souza saw Minogue's cover photo in Australia's Who Magazine as one of "The 30 Most Beautiful People in the World" and offered her a role opposite Jean-Claude Van Damme in the film Street Fighter. The film was a moderate success, earning US$70 million in the US, but received poor reviews, with The Washington Posts Richard Harrington calling Minogue "the worst actress in the English-speaking world". She had a minor role in the 1996 film Bio-Dome starring Pauly Shore and Stephen Baldwin. She also appeared in the 1995 short film Hayride to Hell and in the 1997 film Diana & Me. In 1995, Minogue collaborated with Australian artist Nick Cave for the song "Where the Wild Roses Grow". Cave had been interested in working with Minogue since hearing "Better the Devil You Know", saying it contained "one of pop music's most violent and distressing lyrics". The music video for their song was inspired by John Everett Millais's painting Ophelia (1851–1852), and showed Minogue as the murdered woman, floating in a pond as a serpent swam over her body. The single received widespread attention in Europe, where it reached the top 10 in several countries, and reached number two in Australia. The song won ARIA Awards for "Song of the Year" and "Best Pop Release". Following concert appearances with Cave, Minogue recited the lyrics to "I Should Be So Lucky" as poetry in London's Royal Albert Hall.

By 1997, Minogue was in a relationship with French photographer Stéphane Sednaoui, who encouraged her to develop her creativity. Inspired by a mutual appreciation of Japanese culture, they created a visual combination of "geisha and manga superheroine" for the photographs taken for Minogue's sixth album, Impossible Princess, and the video for "German Bold Italic", Minogue's collaboration with Towa Tei. She drew inspiration from the music of artists such as Shirley Manson and Garbage, Björk, Tricky and U2, and Japanese pop musicians such as Pizzicato Five and Towa Tei. The album featured collaborations with musicians including James Dean Bradfield and Sean Moore of the Manic Street Preachers. Impossible Princess garnered some negative reviews upon its release in 1997, but would be praised as Minogue's most personal and best work in retrospective reviews. In 2003, Slant Magazines Sal Cinquemani called it a "deeply personal effort" and "Minogue's best album to date", while Evan Sawdey, from PopMatters, described Impossible Princess as "one of the most crazed, damn-near perfect dance-pop albums ever created" in a 2008 review. Mostly a dance album, Minogue countered suggestions that she was trying to become an indie artist.

Acknowledging that she had attempted to escape the perceptions of her that had developed during her early career, Minogue commented that she was ready to "forget the painful criticism" and "accept the past, embrace it, use it". The music video for "Did It Again" paid homage to her earlier incarnations. Retitled Kylie Minogue in the UK following the death of Diana, Princess of Wales, it became the lowest-selling album of her career. At the end of the year, a campaign by Virgin Radio stated, "We've done something to improve Kylie's records: we've banned them." In Australia, the album was a success and spent 35 weeks on the album chart. Minogue's Intimate and Live tour in 1998 was extended due to demand. She gave several live performances in Australia, including the 1998 Sydney Gay and Lesbian Mardi Gras, and the opening ceremonies of Melbourne's Crown Casino, and Sydney's Fox Studios in 1999 (where she performed Marilyn Monroe's "Diamonds Are a Girl's Best Friend") as well as a Christmas concert in Dili, East Timor, in association with the United Nations Peace-Keeping Forces. She played a small role in the Australian-made Molly Ringwald 2000 film Cut.

1999–2003: Light Years, Fever and Body Language

In 1999, Minogue performed a duet with the Pet Shop Boys' on their Nightlife album and spent several months in Barbados performing in Shakespeare's The Tempest. She then appeared in the film Sample People and recorded a cover version of Russell Morris's "The Real Thing" for the soundtrack. She signed with Parlophone in April, who wanted to re-establish Minogue as a pop artist. Her seventh studio album, Light Years, was released on 25 September 2000. NME magazine called it a "fun, perfectly-formed" record, which saw Minogue "dropping her considerable concern for cool and bouncing back to her disco-pop roots". It was a commercial success, becoming Minogue's first number-one album in her native Australia. The lead single, "Spinning Around", debuted atop the UK Singles Chart in July, making her only the second artist to have a number-one single in three consecutive decades (after Madonna). Its accompanying video featured Minogue in revealing gold hotpants, which came to be regarded as a "trademark". Three other singles—"On a Night Like This", "Kids" (with Robbie Williams), and "Please Stay"—peaked in the top ten in the United Kingdom.

An elaborate art book titled Kylie, featuring contributions by Minogue and creative director William Baker, was published by Booth-Clibborn in March 2000. At the time, she began a romantic relationship with model James Gooding. In October, Minogue performed at both the closing ceremonies of 2000 Sydney Olympics and in the opening ceremony of the Paralympics. Her performance of ABBA's "Dancing Queen" was chosen as one of the most memorable Olympic closing ceremony moments by Kate Samuelson of TNT. The following year, she embarked on the On a Night Like This Tour, which was inspired by the style of Broadway shows and the musicals of the 1930s. She also made a brief cameo as The Green Fairy in Baz Luhrmann's Moulin Rouge!, which earned her an MTV Movie Award nomination in 2002. "Spinning Around" and Light Years consecutively won the ARIA Award for Best Pop Release in 2000 and 2001.

In September 2001, Minogue released "Can't Get You Out of My Head", the lead single from her eighth studio album, Fever. It reached number one in over 40 countries and sold 5 million copies, becoming Minogue's most successful single to date. The accompanying music video featured the singer sporting an infamous hooded white jumpsuit with deep plunging neckline. The remaining singles—"In Your Eyes", "Love at First Sight" and "Come into My World"—all peaked in the top ten in Australia and the United Kingdom. Released on 1 October, Fever topped the charts in Australia, Austria, Germany, Ireland, and the United Kingdom, eventually achieving worldwide sales in excess of six million. Dominique Leone from Pitchfork praised its simple and "comfortable" composition, terming it a "mature sound from a mature artist, and one that may very well re-establish Minogue for the VH1 generation".
The warm reception towards the album led to its release in the United States in February 2002 by Capitol Records, Minogue's first in 13 years. It debuted on the Billboard 200 at number three, her highest-charting album in the region, while peaking at number 10 on the Canadian Albums Chart.

To support the album, Minogue headlined her KylieFever2002 tour in Europe and Australia, which ran from April to August 2002. She performed several songs from the setlist in a series of Jingle Ball concerts in the United States in 2002–2003. In May 2002, Minogue and Gooding announced the end of their relationship after two and a half years. She received four accolades at the ARIA Music Awards of 2002, including Highest Selling Single and Single of the Year for "Can't Get You Out of My Head". That same year, she won her first Brit Award for International Female Solo Artist and Best International Album for Fever. In 2003, she received her first Grammy nomination for Best Dance Recording for "Love at First Sight", before winning the award for "Come into My World" the following year, marking the first time an Australian music artist had won in a major category since Men at Work in 1983.

In November 2003, Minogue released her ninth studio album, Body Language, following an invitation-only concert, titled Money Can't Buy, at the Hammersmith Apollo in London. The album downplayed the disco style and was inspired by 1980s artists such as Scritti Politti, The Human League, Adam and the Ants and Prince, blending their styles with elements of hip hop. The sales of the album were lower than anticipated after the success of Fever, though the first single, "Slow", was a number-one hit in the United Kingdom and Australia. Two more singles from the album were released: "Red Blooded Woman" and "Chocolate". In the US, "Slow" reached number-one on the club chart and received a Grammy Award nomination in the Best Dance Recording category. Body Language achieved first week sales of 43,000 and declined significantly in the second week.

2004–2009: Ultimate Kylie, Showgirl and X

In November 2004, Minogue released her second official greatest hits album, entitled Ultimate Kylie. The album yielded two singles: "I Believe in You" and "Giving You Up". "I Believe in You" was later nominated for a Grammy Award in the category of "Best Dance Recording". In March 2005, Minogue commenced her Showgirl: The Greatest Hits Tour. After performing in Europe, she travelled to Melbourne, where she was diagnosed with breast cancer, forcing her to cancel the tour. She underwent surgery in May 2005 and commenced chemotherapy treatment soon after. It was announced in January 2006 that she had finished chemotherapy and the disease "had no recurrence" after the surgery. She would continue her treatment for the next months. In December 2005, Minogue released a digital-only single, "Over the Rainbow", a live recording from her Showgirl tour. Her children's book, The Showgirl Princess, written during her period of convalescence, was published in October 2006, and her perfume, "Darling", was launched in November. The range was later augmented by eau de toilettes including Pink Sparkle, Couture and Inverse.

Minogue resumed her then cancelled tour in November 2006, under the title Showgirl: The Homecoming Tour. Her dance routines had been reworked to accommodate her medical condition, with slower costume changes and longer breaks introduced between sections of the show to conserve her strength. The media reported that Minogue performed energetically, with the Sydney Morning Herald describing the show as an "extravaganza" and "nothing less than a triumph". She voiced Florence in the animated film The Magic Roundabout, based on the television series of the same name. She finished her voice role back in 2002, before it was released in 2005 in Europe. A year later, she reprised the role and recorded the theme song for the American edition, re-titled as Doogal, which grossed $26,691,243 worldwide.

In November 2007, Minogue released her tenth and much-discussed "comeback" album, X. The electro-styled album included contributions from Guy Chambers, Cathy Dennis, Bloodshy & Avant and Calvin Harris. The album received some criticism for the triviality of its subject matter in light of Minogue's experiences with breast cancer. X and its lead single, "2 Hearts", entered at number one on the Australian albums and singles charts, respectively. In the United Kingdom, X initially attracted lukewarm sales, although its commercial performance eventually improved. Follow-up singles from the album, "In My Arms" and "Wow", both peaked inside the top ten of the UK Singles Chart. In the US, the album was nominated at the 2009 Grammy Awards for Best Electronic/Dance Album.

Minogue began a relationship with French actor Olivier Martinez after meeting him at the 2003 Grammy Awards ceremony. They ended their relationship in February 2007, but remained on friendly terms. Minogue was reported to have been "saddened by false [media] accusations of [Martinez's] disloyalty". She defended Martinez, and acknowledged the support he had given during her treatment for breast cancer. As part of the promotion of her album, Minogue was featured in White Diamond, a documentary filmed during 2006 and 2007 as she resumed her Showgirl: The Homecoming Tour. She also appeared in The Kylie Show, which featured her performances as well as comedy sketches. She co-starred in the 2007 Doctor Who Christmas special episode, "Voyage of the Damned", as Astrid Peth. The episode was watched by 13.31 million viewers, which was the show's highest viewing figure since 1979.

In May 2008, Minogue embarked on the European leg of the KylieX2008 tour, her most expensive tour to date with production costs of £10 million. The tour was generally acclaimed and sold well. She was then appointed a Chevalier of the French Ordre des Arts et des Lettres, the junior grade of France's highest cultural honour. In July, she was officially invested by The Prince of Wales as an Officer of the Order of the British Empire. She also won the "Best International Female Solo Artist" award at the 2008 BRIT Awards. In September, she made her Middle East debut as the headline act at the opening of Atlantis, The Palm, an exclusive hotel resort in Dubai, and from November, she continued her KylieX2008 tour, taking the show to cities across South America, Asia and Australia. The tour visited 21 countries, and was considered a success, with ticket sales estimated at $70,000,000. In 2009, Minogue hosted the BRIT Awards with James Corden and Mathew Horne. She then embarked on the For You, for Me tour which was her first North American concert tour. She was also featured in the Hindi movie, Blue, performing an A. R. Rahman song. Minogue was in a relationship with model Andrés Velencoso from 2008 to 2013.

2010–2012: Aphrodite, Anti Tour and The Abbey Road Sessions

In July 2010, Minogue released her eleventh studio album, Aphrodite. The album featured new songwriters and producers including Stuart Price as executive producer. Price also contributed to song writing along with Minogue, Calvin Harris, Jake Shears, Nerina Pallot, Pascal Gabriel, Lucas Secon, Keane's Tim Rice-Oxley and Kish Mauve. The album received favourable reviews from most music critics; Rob Sheffield from Rolling Stone labelled the album Minogue's "finest work since 1997's underrated Impossible Princess" and Tim Sendra from Allmusic commended Minogue's choice of collaborators and producers, commenting that the album is the "work of someone who knows exactly what her skills are and who to hire to help showcase them to perfection". Aphrodite debuted at number-one in the United Kingdom, exactly 22 years after her first number one hit in the United Kingdom. The album's lead single, "All the Lovers," was a success and became her 33rd top ten single in the United Kingdom, though subsequent singles from the album—"Get Outta My Way", "Better than Today", and "Put Your Hands Up"—failed to reach the top ten of the UK Singles Chart. However, all the singles released from the album have topped the US Billboard Hot Dance Club Songs chart.

Minogue recorded a duet with synthpop duo Hurts on their song "Devotion", which was included on the group's album Happiness. She was then featured on Taio Cruz's single "Higher". The result was successful, peaking inside the top 20 in several charts and impacting the US Hot Dance Club Charts. In February 2011, Minogue became the first act to hold two of the top three spots on the US Dance/Club Play Songs survey, with "Better Than Today" at number one and "Higher" at number 3. To conclude her recordings in 2010, she released the extended play A Kylie Christmas, which included covers of Christmas songs including "Let It Snow" and "Santa Baby". Minogue embarked on the Aphrodite: Les Folies Tour in February 2011, travelling to Europe, North America, Asia, Australia and Africa. With a stage set inspired by the birth of the love goddess Aphrodite and Grecian culture and history, it was greeted with positive reviews from critics, who praised the concept and the stage production. The tour was a commercial success, grossing US$60 million and ranking at number six and 21 on the mid-year and annual Pollstar Top Concert Tours of 2011 respectively.

In March 2012, Minogue began a year-long celebration for her 25 years in the music industry, which was often called "K25". The anniversary started with her embarking on the Anti Tour in England and Australia, which featured b-sides, demos and rarities from her music catalogue. The tour was positively received for its intimate atmosphere and was a commercial success, grossing over two million dollars from four shows. She then released the single "Timebomb" in May, the greatest hits compilation album, The Best of Kylie Minogue in June and the singles box-set, K25 Time Capsule in October. She performed at various events around the world, including Sydney Mardi Gras, Queen Elizabeth II's Diamond Jubilee Concert, and BBC Proms in the Park London 2012. Minogue released the compilation album The Abbey Road Sessions in October. The album contained reworked and orchestral versions of her previous songs. It was recorded at London's Abbey Road Studios and was produced by Steve Anderson and Colin Elliot. The album received favourable reviews from music critics and debuted at number-two in the United Kingdom.  The album spawned two singles, "Flower" and "On a Night Like This". Minogue returned to acting and starred in two films: a cameo appearance in the American independent film Jack & Diane and a lead role in the French film Holy Motors. Jack & Diane opened at the Tribeca Film Festival on 20 April 2012, while Holy Motors opened at the 2012 Cannes Film Festival, which Minogue attended.

2013–2016: Kiss Me Once and Kylie Christmas

In January 2013, Minogue and her manager Terry Blamey, whom she had worked with since the start of her singing career, parted ways. The following month, she signed to Roc Nation for a management deal. In September, she was featured on Italian singer-songwriter Laura Pausini's single "Limpido", which was a number-one hit in Italy and received a nomination for "World's Best Song" at the 2013 World Music Awards. In the same month, Minogue was hired as a coach for the third series of BBC One's talent competition The Voice UK, alongside record producer and Black Eyed Peas member, will.i.am, Kaiser Chiefs' lead singer Ricky Wilson and singer Sir Tom Jones. The show opened with 9.35 million views from the UK, a large percentage increase from the second season. It accumulated an estimated 8.10 million viewers on average. Minogue's judging and personality on the show were singled out for praise. Ed Power from The Daily Telegraph gave the series premiere 3 stars, praising Minogue for being "glamorous, agreeably giggly [and] a card-carrying national treasure". In November, she was hired as a coach for the third season of The Voice Australia.

In March 2014, Minogue released her twelfth studio album, Kiss Me Once. The album featured contributions from Sia, Mike Del Rio, Cutfather, Pharrell Williams, MNEK and Ariel Rechtshaid. It peaked at number one in Australia and number two in the United Kingdom. The singles from the album, "Into the Blue" and "I Was Gonna Cancel", did not chart inside the top ten of the UK Singles Chart, peaking at number 12 and number 59 respectively. In August, Minogue performed a seven-song set at the closing ceremony of the 2014 Commonwealth Games, donning a custom Jean Paul Gaultier corset. In September, she embarked on the Kiss Me Once Tour. In January 2015, Minogue appeared as a guest vocalist on Giorgio Moroder's single "Right Here, Right Now" providing her 12th number one hit on the U.S. Dance Chart on 18 April 2015.

In March, Minogue's contract with Parlophone Records ended, leaving her future music releases with Warner Music Group in Australia and New Zealand. The same month, she parted ways with Roc Nation. In April, Minogue played tech reporter Shauna in a two episode arc on the ABC Family series, Young & Hungry. Also in April, reality TV personality Kylie Jenner entered into a trademark dispute with Minogue in her attempt to establish the brand "Kylie", which Minogue has been trading under since the 1990s. The dispute was eventually resolved in Minogue's favor in 2017. Minogue also appeared as Susan Riddick in the disaster film San Andreas, released in May and starring Dwayne Johnson and Carla Gugino. In September 2015, an extended play with Fernando Garibay titled Kylie + Garibay was released. Garibay and Giorgio Moroder served as producers for the extended play. In November, Minogue was a featured artist on the track, "The Other Boys" by Nervo, alongside Jake Shears and Nile Rodgers. This became her 13th chart topper on the U.S Dance Chart, lifting her position in the list of artists with the most U.S. Dance Chart number ones to equal 8th alongside Whitney Houston, Enrique Iglesias and Lady Gaga.

In December 2015, Minogue was the guest on BBC Radio 4's Desert Island Discs. Her choices included "Dancing Queen" by ABBA, "Purple Rain" by Prince and "Need You Tonight" by INXS. Minogue released her first Christmas album, Kylie Christmas, in November 2015. In 2016, she recorded the theme song "This Wheel's on Fire", from the soundtrack Absolutely Fabulous: The Movie. Minogue's holiday album Kylie Christmas was re-released in November entitled as Kylie Christmas: Snow Queen Edition. In November 2015, Minogue confirmed she was dating British actor Joshua Sasse. On 20 February 2016, their engagement was announced in the "Forthcoming Marriages" section of The Daily Telegraph, but in February 2017, she confirmed the couple had ended their relationship.

2017–present: Golden, Step Back in Time: The Definitive Collection and Disco

In February 2017, Minogue signed a new record deal with BMG Rights Management. In December 2017, Minogue and BMG had struck a joint-deal with Mushroom Music Labels — under the sub-division label Liberator to release her new album in Australia and New Zealand. In 2017, Minogue worked with writers and producers for her 14th studio album, including Sky Adams and Richard Stannard, and recorded the album in London, Los Angeles and Nashville, with the latter profoundly influencing the record. Minogue's album Golden was released in April 2018 with "Dancing" serving as its lead single. The album debuted at number one in the UK and Australia. Tim Sendra from AllMusic labelled Golden a "darn bold" for an artist of Minogue's longevity, stating "The amazing thing about the album, and about Minogue, is that she pulls off the country as well as she's pulled off new wave, disco, electro, murder ballads, and everything else she's done in her long career." Golden also received criticism, with Pitchfork'''s Ben Cardew claiming that it "sounds like someone playing at country music, rather than someone who understands it." Minogue was among the performers at The Queen's Birthday Party held at the Royal Albert Hall in April 2018. Minogue began dating Paul Solomons, the creative director of British GQ, in 2018.

Minogue released a greatest hits compilation Step Back in Time: The Definitive Collection on 28 June 2019, featuring "New York City" as the lead single. The album reached number one in her native Australia and in the UK, becoming her seventh album to reach the top spot in the latter. On 30 June, Minogue made her debut at the Glastonbury Festival, fourteen years after her breast cancer diagnosis forced her to cancel her 2005 headlining slot. Performing in the Legends Slot, Minogue's set featured guest appearances from Nick Cave and Chris Martin. Her set received rave reviews from critics, with The Guardian declaring it a "solid-gold", "peerless" and "phenomenal". It was a big hit with fans, with Minogue's performance being the most-watched set of the BBC coverage (earning three million viewers, ahead of The Killers who received 1.4 million) and reportedly breaking records for the most attended Glastonbury set in history. Minogue also appeared in her own Christmas television special, Kylie's Secret Night, which aired on Channel 4 in December 2019.

Following her Glastonbury performance, Minogue stated that she would like to create a "pop-disco album" and return to recording new material after the performance. Work continued on Disco during the COVID-19 pandemic in 2020, with Minogue using a home studio to record throughout lockdown. Alistair Norbury, president of Minogue's record label BMG, announced to industry title Music Week that Minogue was also learning to record and engineer her own vocals using music software Logic Pro in order to continue working apace during lockdown. On 23 July 2020, "Say Something" was unveiled as the first single from Disco. The album's second single, "Magic", was released on 24 September, and a promotional single, "I Love It", followed on 23 October.Disco was released on 6 November 2020, reaching number one in her native Australia and in the UK, where Minogue became the first female solo artist to achieve a number one album in five consecutive decades from the 1980s to the 2020s. In the same month, she was featured on Children in Need's charity single – "Stop Crying Your Heart Out". On 5 December 2020, "Real Groove" was announced as the album's third single. A subsequent remix was released on 31 December 2020 with Dua Lipa. In May 2021, Minogue featured on a remix of "Starstruck" with Years & Years. Minogue reissued Disco on 12 November 2021, preceded with the release of "A Second to Midnight" featuring Years & Years. The reissue, titled Disco: Guest List Edition, included duets with Jessie Ware and Gloria Gaynor, aside from remixes of Discos singles.

On 28 July 2022, Minogue returned as Charlene to Neighbours for a one-off cameo appearance (alongside Jason Donovan as Scott) for the show's series finale.

On 8 August 2022 it was announced that Minogue would release her sixteenth studio album in the first half of 2023.

Artistry
Minogue explained that she first became interested in pop music during her adolescence: "I first got into pop music in 1981, I'd say. It was all about Prince, Adam + the Ants, that whole New Romantic period. Prior to that, it was the Jackson 5, Donna Summer, and my dad's records – the Stones and Beatles." She would also listen to the records of Olivia Newton-John and ABBA. Minogue said that she "wanted to be" Newton-John while growing up. Her producer, Pete Waterman, recalled Minogue during the early years of her music career with the observation: "She was setting her sights on becoming the new Prince or Madonna ... What I found amazing was that she was outselling Madonna four to one, but still wanted to be her." Minogue came to prominence in the music scene as a bubblegum pop singer and was deemed a "product of the Stock, Aitken & Waterman Hit Factory". Musician Nick Cave, who worked with Minogue in some occasions, was a major influence on her artistic development. She told The Guardian: "He's definitely infiltrated my life in beautiful and profound ways." Throughout her career, Minogue's work was also influenced by Cathy Dennis, D Mob, Scritti Politti, Björk, Tricky, U2 and Pizzicato Five, among others.

Minogue has been known for her soft soprano vocal range. Tim Sendra of AllMusic reviewed her album Aphrodite and said that Minogue's "slightly nasal, girl-next-door vocals serve her needs perfectly." According to Fiona MacDonald from Madison magazine, Minogue "has never shied away from making some brave but questionable artistic decisions". In musical terms, Minogue has worked with many genres in pop and dance music. However, her signature music has been contemporary disco music. Her first studio albums with Stock, Aitken, and Waterman present a more bubblegum pop influence, with many critics comparing her to Madonna. Chris True from AllMusic, reviewed her debut Kylie and found her music "standard late-'80s Stock-Aitken-Waterman bubblegum", however he stated that she presented the most personality of any 1980s recording artist. He said of her third album Rhythm of Love, from the early 1990s, "The songwriting is stronger, the production dynamic, and Kylie seems more confident vocally." At the time of her third studio album, "She began to trade in her cutesy, bubblegum pop image for a more mature one, and in turn, a more sexual one." Chris True stated that during her relationship with Michael Hutchence, "her shedding of the near-virginal façade that dominated her first two albums, began to have an effect, not only on how the press and her fans treated her, but in the evolution of her music."

From Minogue's work on her sixth studio album, Impossible Princess, her songwriting and musical content began to change. She was constantly writing down words, exploring the form and meaning of sentences. She had written lyrics before, but called them "safe, just neatly rhymed words and that's that". Sal Cinquemani from Slant Magazine said that the album bears a resemblance to Madonna's Ray of Light (1998). He said that she took inspiration from "both the Brit-pop and electronica movements of the mid-'90s", saying that "Impossible Princess is the work of an artist willing to take risks". Her next effort, Light Years is a disco-influenced dance-pop record, with AllMusic's Chris True calling it "Arguably one of the best disco records since the '70s". True stated that her eighth album, Fever, "combines the disco-diva comeback of Light Years with simple dance rhythms". Her ninth album, Body Language, was quite different from her musical experiments in the past as it was a "successful" attempt at broadening her sound with electro and hip-hop for instance. Incorporating styles of dance music with funk, disco and R&B, the album was listed on Qs "Best Albums of 2003".

Critics said Minogue's tenth record X did not feature enough "consistency" and Chris True called the tracks "cold, calculated dance-pop numbers." Tim Sendra of AllMusic said that her eleventh album, Aphrodite, "rarely strays past sweet love songs or happy dance anthems" and "the main sound is the kind of glittery disco pop that really is her strong suit." Sendra found Aphrodite "One of her best, in fact." Minogue's 14th studio album, Golden was heavily influenced by country music, although maintaining her dance-pop sensibilities. Sal Cinquemani from Slant Magazine wrote that "Golden further bolsters Minogue's reputation for taking risks—and artfully sets the stage for her inevitable disco comeback."

Public image

Minogue's efforts to be taken seriously as a recording artist were initially hindered by the perception that she had not "paid her dues" and was no more than a manufactured pop star exploiting the image she had created during her stint on Neighbours. Minogue acknowledged this viewpoint, saying, "If you're part of a record company, I think to a degree it's fair to say that you're a manufactured product. You're a product and you're selling a product. It doesn't mean that you're not talented and that you don't make creative and business decisions about what you will and won't do and where you want to go."

In 1993, Baz Luhrmann introduced Minogue to photographer Bert Stern, notable for his work with Marilyn Monroe. Stern photographed her in Los Angeles and, comparing her to Monroe, commented that Minogue had a similar mix of vulnerability and eroticism. Throughout her career, Minogue has chosen photographers who attempt to create a new "look" for her, and the resulting photographs have appeared in a variety of magazines, from the cutting edge The Face to the more traditionally sophisticated Vogue and Vanity Fair, making the Minogue face and name known to a broad range of people. Stylist William Baker has suggested that this is part of the reason she entered mainstream pop culture in Europe more successfully than many other pop singers who concentrate solely on selling records.

By 2000, Minogue was considered to have achieved a degree of musical credibility for having maintained her career longer than her critics had expected. Her progression from the wholesome "girl next door" to a more sophisticated performer with a flirtatious and playful persona attracted new fans. Her "Spinning Around" video led to some media outlets referring to her as "SexKylie", and sex became a stronger element in her subsequent videos. In September 2002, she was ranked 27 on VH1's 100 Sexiest Artists list. She was also named one of the 100 Hottest Women of All-Time by Men's Health in 2013. William Baker described her status as a sex symbol as a "double edged sword", observing that "we always attempted to use her sex appeal as an enhancement of her music and to sell a record. But now it has become in danger of eclipsing what she actually is: a pop singer." After 20 years as a performer, Minogue was described by BBCs Fiona Pryor as a fashion "trend-setter" and a "style icon who constantly reinvents herself". Pointing out the several reinventions in Minogue's image, Larissa Dubecki from The Age labelled her the "Mother of Reinvention".

Minogue has been inspired by and compared to Madonna throughout her career. She received negative comments that her Rhythm of Love tour in 1991 was too similar visually to Madonna's Blond Ambition World Tour, for which critics labelled her a Madonna wannabe. Writing for the Observer Music Monthly, Rufus Wainwright described Minogue as "the anti-Madonna. Self-knowledge is a truly beautiful thing and Kylie knows herself inside out. She is what she is and there is no attempt to make quasi-intellectual statements to substantiate it. She is the gay shorthand for joy." Kathy McCabe for The Telegraph noted that Minogue and Madonna follow similar styles in music and fashion, but concluded, "Where they truly diverge on the pop-culture scale is in shock value. Minogue's clips might draw a gasp from some but Madonna's ignite religious and political debate unlike any other artist on the planet ... Simply, Madonna is the dark force; Kylie is the light force." Minogue has said of Madonna, "Her huge influence on the world, in pop and fashion, meant that I wasn't immune to the trends she created. I admire Madonna greatly but in the beginning she made it difficult for artists like me, she had done everything there was to be done", and "Madonna's the Queen of Pop, I'm the princess. I'm quite happy with that."

In January 2007, Madame Tussauds in London unveiled its fourth waxwork of Minogue; only Queen Elizabeth II has had more models created. During the same week a bronze cast of her hands was added to Wembley Arena's "Square of Fame". In 2007, a bronze statue of Minogue was unveiled at Melbourne Docklands for permanent display.

In March 2010, Minogue was declared by researchers as the "most powerful celebrity in Britain". The study examined how marketers identify celebrity and brand partnerships. Mark Husak, head of Millward Brown's UK media practice, said: "Kylie is widely accepted as an adopted Brit. People know her, like her and she is surrounded by positive buzz". In 2016, according to the Sunday Times Rich List, Minogue had a net worth of £55 million.

Minogue is regarded as a gay icon, which she has encouraged with comments including "I am not a traditional gay icon. There's been no tragedy in my life, only tragic outfits" and "My gay audience has been with me from the beginning ... they kind of adopted me." Her status as a gay icon has been attributed to her music, fashion sense and career longevity. Author Constantine Chatzipapatheodoridis wrote about Minogue's appeal to gay men in Strike a Pose, Forever: The Legacy of Vogue... and observed that she "frequently incorporates camp-inflected themes in her extravaganzas, drawing mainly from the disco scene, the S/M culture, and the burlesque stage." In Beautiful Things in Popular Culture (2007), Marc Brennan stated that Minogue's work "provides a gorgeous form of escapism". Minogue has explained that she first became aware of her gay audience in 1988, when several drag queens performed to her music at a Sydney pub, and she later saw a similar show in Melbourne. She said that she felt "very touched" to have such an "appreciative crowd", and this encouraged her to perform at gay venues throughout the world, as well as headlining the 1994 Sydney Gay and Lesbian Mardi Gras. Minogue has one of the largest gay followings in the world.

Impact and legacyEntertainment Weeklys Ernest Macias said that, by combining "a panache for fabulous fashion" with "her unequivocal disco-pop sound", Minogue  "established herself as a timeless icon." Paula Joye of The Sydney Morning Herald wrote that "Minogue's fusion of fashion and music has made a huge contribution to the style zeitgeist." Fiona MacDonald, from fashion magazine Madison, acknowledged Minogue as "one of the handful of singers recognised around the world by her first name alone. ... And yet despite becoming an international music superstar, style icon and honorary Brit, those two syllables still seem as Australian as the smell of eucalyptus or a barbeque on a hot day." In 2009, the Victoria and Albert Museum "celebrated her influence on fashion" with an exhibition called Kylie Minogue: Image of a Pop Star.

In 2012, Dino Scatena of The Sydney Morning Herald wrote about Minogue: "A quarter of a century ago, a sequence of symbiotic events altered the fabric of Australian popular culture and set in motion the transformation of a 19-year-old soap actor from Melbourne into an international pop icon." Scatena also described her as "Australia's single most successful entertainer and a world-renowned style idol". In the same year, VH1 cited Minogue among its choices on the 100 Greatest Women in Music and the 50 Greatest Women of the Video Era.

Minogue has been recognised with many honorific nicknames, most notably the "Princess of Pop". Jon O'Brien of AllMusic reviewed her box-set Kylie: The Albums 2000–2010 and stated that it "contains plenty of moments to justify her position as one of the all-time premier pop princesses." In January 2012, NME critics ranked her single "Can't Get You Out of My Head" at number four on their Greatest Pop Songs in History list. Channel 4 listed her as one of the world's greatest pop stars. In 2020, Rolling Stone Australia placed her at number three on its 50 Greatest Australian Artists of All Time list.

Minogue's work has influenced pop and dance artists including Dua Lipa, Jessie Ware, Alice Chater, Rina Sawayama, Kim Petras, Melanie C, Ricki-Lee Coulter, Years & Years singer Olly Alexander, September, Diana Vickers, The Veronicas, Slayyyter, Pabllo Vittar and Paris Hilton. In 2007, French avant-garde guitarist Noël Akchoté released So Lucky, featuring solo guitar versions of tunes recorded by Minogue.

Achievements

Minogue has received many accolades, including a Grammy Award, three Brit Awards, 17 ARIA Music Awards, two MTV Video Music Awards, two MTV Europe Music Awards and six Mo Awards, including the Australian Performer of the Year in 2001 and 2003. In 2008, she was honoured with Music Industry Trust's award for recognition of her 20-year career and was hailed as "an icon of pop and style", becoming the first female musician to receive a Music Industry Trust award. In April 2017, the Britain-Australia Society recognised Minogue with its 2016 award for outstanding contribution to the improving of relations and bilateral understanding between Britain and Australia. The citation reads: "In recognition of significant contributions to the Britain-Australia relationship as an acclaimed singer, songwriter, actor and iconic personality in both countries". The award was announced at a reception in Australia House but was personally presented the next day by Prince Philip, Patron of the Society, at Windsor Castle.

As of 2020, she has sold 80 million records worldwide. Minogue is the most successful Australian female recording artist of all time and, in November 2011, on the 25th anniversary of the ARIA Music Awards, she was inducted by the Australian Recording Industry Association into the ARIA Hall of Fame. In June 2012, The Official Chart Company revealed that Minogue is the 12th best selling singer in the United Kingdom to date, and the third best selling female artist, selling over 10.1 million singles. In January 2011, Minogue received a Guinness World Records citation for having the most consecutive decades with top five albums in the UK, with all her albums doing so. Minogue and American singer Madonna are the only artists to have had reached the top position of the UK Albums Chart in four consecutive decades, from the 1980s to the 2010s. Minogue's fifteenth studio album, Disco reached number one in the UK Albums Chart in 2020. It made her the first female artist to reach the top spot of the chart in five consecutive decades, from the 1980s to the 2020s.

According to PRS for Music, her single "Can't Get You Out of My Head" was the most-played track of the 2000s, "after receiving the most airplay and live covers" in the decade.
In 2004, she held the record for the most singles at number one in the ARIA singles chart, with nine. In 2011, she made history for having two songs inside the top three on the U.S. Dance Club Songs chart, with her singles "Better than Today" and "Higher" charting at one and three, respectively. In December 2016, Billboard ranked her as the 18th most successful dance artist of all time.

Business career
Minogue sells a range of wines bearing her name, including Britain's top-selling rosé prosecco.

Personal life
Philanthropy

Minogue has helped fundraise on many occasions.  In 1989, she participated in recording "Do They Know It's Christmas?" under the name Band Aid II to help raise money. In early 2010, Minogue along with many other artists (under the name Helping Haiti) recorded a cover version of "Everybody Hurts". The single was a fundraiser to help after the 2010 Haiti earthquake. She also spent a week in Thailand after the 2004 tsunami. During her 2011 Aphrodite World Tour, the 2011 Tōhoku earthquake and tsunami struck Japan, which was on her itinerary. She declared she would continue to tour there, stating, "I was here to do shows and I chose not to cancel, Why did I choose not to cancel? I thought long and hard about it and it wasn't an easy decision to make." While she was there, she and Australian Prime Minister Julia Gillard were star guests at an Australian Embassy fundraiser for the disaster. In January 2020, in response to the 2019–20 Australian bushfires, Minogue announced that she and her family were donating A$500,000 towards immediate firefighting efforts and ongoing support.

In 2008, Minogue pledged her support for a campaign to raise money for abused children, to be donated to the British charities ChildLine and the National Society for the Prevention of Cruelty to Children. According to the source, around $93 million was raised. She spoke out in relation to the cause, saying: "Finding the courage to tell someone about being abused is one of the most difficult decisions a child will ever have to make." Minogue is a frequent supporter of amfAR, The Foundation for AIDS Research, hosting the amfAR Inspiration Gala in Los Angeles in 2010. She has also attended amfAR fundraising benefits in Cannes, and performed at galas for the charity in São Paulo and Hong Kong.

Since Minogue's breast cancer diagnosis in 2005, she has been a sponsor and ambassador for the cause. In May 2010, she held a breast cancer campaign for the first time. She later spoke about the cause saying "It means so much to me to be part of this year's campaign for Fashion Targets Breast Cancer. I wholeheartedly support their efforts to raise funds for the vital work undertaken by Breakthrough Breast Cancer." For the cause, she "posed in a silk sheet emblazoned with the distinctive target logo of Fashion Targets Breast Cancer" for photographer Mario Testino. In April 2014, Minogue launched One Note Against Cancer, a campaign to raise funds and awareness for French cancer research charity APREC (The Alliance for Cancer Research). As part of the campaign, Minogue released the single "Crystallize", with fans able to bid via online auction to own each of the song's 4,408 notes. The proceeds of the auction were donated to APREC, with the names of the successful bidders appearing in the accompanying music video's credits.

Health
Minogue was diagnosed with breast cancer at age 36 in May 2005, leading to the postponement of the remainder of her Showgirl: The Greatest Hits Tour and her withdrawal from the Glastonbury Festival. Her hospitalisation and treatment in Melbourne resulted in a brief but intense period of media coverage, particularly in Australia, where then Prime Minister John Howard issued a statement of support. As media and fans began to congregate outside the Minogue residence in Melbourne, Victorian Premier Steve Bracks warned the international media that any disruption of the Minogue family's rights under Australian privacy laws would not be tolerated.

Minogue underwent surgery on 21 May 2005 at Cabrini Hospital in Malvern and commenced chemotherapy treatment soon after. After the surgery, the disease "had no recurrence". On 8 July 2005, she made her first public appearance after surgery when she visited a children's cancer ward at Melbourne's Royal Children's Hospital. She returned to France where she completed her chemotherapy treatment at the Institut Gustave-Roussy in Villejuif, near Paris. In January 2006, Minogue's publicist announced that she had finished chemotherapy, and her treatment continued for the next months. On her return to Australia for her concert tour, she discussed her illness and said that her chemotherapy treatment had been like "experiencing a nuclear bomb". While appearing on The Ellen DeGeneres Show in 2008, Minogue said that her cancer had originally been misdiagnosed. She commented, "Because someone is in a white coat and using big medical instruments doesn't necessarily mean they're right", but later spoke of her respect for the medical profession.

Minogue was acknowledged for the impact she made by publicly discussing her cancer diagnosis and treatment. In May 2008, the French Cultural Minister Christine Albanel said, "Doctors now even go as far as saying there is a "Kylie effect" that encourages young women to have regular checks." Several scientific studies have been carried out how publicity around her case resulted in more women undergoing regular checks for cancer symptoms. Television host Giuliana Rancic cited Minogue's cancer story as "inspirational" when she too was diagnosed with cancer.

 Relationships 
Minogue has been in relationships with Jason Donovan, Olivier Martinez, Andrés Velencoso and Michael Hutchence. She had an affair with co-star Jean-Claude Van Damme while shooting Street Fighter'' in Thailand. Minogue was in a relationship with British GQ creative director Paul Solomons from 2018 to 2023.

After over a decade living full time in London, England, she decided in 2022, to relocate and be with her wider family in Australia, she is currently based in Melbourne.

Discography

Tours and concerts

Filmography

See also

 Kylie Minogue products
 List of artists who reached number one on the U.S. Dance Club Songs chart
 List of artists who reached number one on the UK Singles Chart
 List of best-selling singles worldwide
 List of songs recorded by Kylie Minogue

References

Citations

Sources

External links

 
 

 
1968 births
Living people
Musicians from Melbourne
20th-century Australian actresses
20th-century Australian women singers
21st-century Australian actresses
21st-century Australian women singers
ARIA Award winners
ARIA Hall of Fame inductees
Actresses from Melbourne
Australian Officers of the Order of the British Empire
Australian child actresses
Australian dance musicians
Australian emigrants to England
Australian women pop singers
Australian film actresses
Australian people of English descent
Australian people of Welsh descent
Australian soap opera actresses
Australian television personalities
Women television personalities
Australian video game actresses
Australian voice actresses
Australian women in electronic music
Brit Award winners
Capitol Records artists
Chevaliers of the Ordre des Arts et des Lettres
Dance-pop musicians
Freestyle musicians
Gold Logie winners
Grammy Award winners for dance and electronic music
MTV Europe Music Award winners
Helpmann Award winners
Australian LGBT rights activists
NME Awards winners
Nu-disco musicians
Officers of the Order of Australia
Parlophone artists
Recipients of the Centenary Medal
Singers from Melbourne
Synth-pop singers
Warner Records artists
Australian sopranos
BT Digital Music Awards winners
People from Surrey Hills, Victoria